Sesto al Reghena is a comune (municipality) in the Province of Pordenone in the Italian region Friuli-Venezia Giulia, located in the lower Friulian-Venetian plain about  northwest of Trieste and about  southeast of Pordenone.

Sesto al Reghena borders the following municipalities: Chions, Cinto Caomaggiore, Cordovado, Gruaro, Morsano al Tagliamento, San Vito al Tagliamento.

Main sights

Sights include:
 the abbey of Santa Maria in Sylvis, a Benedictine monastery built in the 8th century.
 Villa Freschi, a Venetian villa from the 18th century in the locality of Ramuscello.
 All Saint´s Church, a parish church from the 1300 located in Bagnarola.
 The fountain of Venchiaredo, a literary place in Friuli, celebrated by Italian writer Ippolito Nievo and rediscovered by Italian poet Pier Paolo Pasolini.
 Church of Saint Peter, originally medieval small church with a fresco of the fifteenth century portraying the Virgin Mary, Jesus and Saint Sebastian.
 Small Church of St. Anthony of Padua (Sesto al Reghena), a Catholic church located in a private property

References

External links
 Official website

Cities and towns in Friuli-Venezia Giulia